Usenet II was a proposed alternative to the classic Usenet hierarchy, started in 1998. Unlike the original Usenet, it was peered only between "sound sites" and employed a system of rules to keep out spam.

Usenet II was backed by influential Usenetters like Russ Allbery.

Sometime between 2010 and 2011, the web page for Usenet II went offline.

The newsgroup hierarchy in Usenet II revived the old naming system used by Usenet before the Great Renaming.  All groups had names starting "net.", which serve to distinguish them from the "Big 8" (misc.*, sci.*, news.*, rec.*, soc.*, talk.*, comp.*, humanities.*).  A separate checkgroup system, using the same technical mechanism as the one produced by David C. Lawrence for the Big 8, enforced the Usenet II hierarchy and prevents the creation of unauthorized newsgroups within it.

The basic principles of operation were controlled by a Steering Committee, which appointed "hierarchy czars" who were responsible for the content of specific portions of the namespace, or hierarchies.

Usenet II had strictly enforced rules. Readers of messages in Usenet II had to be fully compliant with the RFC 1036 (Usenet) standard plus some additional format compliance rules that were specific to Usenet II.  A message header had to contain a valid email address in the From field.  It was required to have an NNTP-Posting-Host header field containing a sound site.  The distribution field was to be set to "4gh" (a reference to Shockwave Rider by John Brunner).  If the Subject field started with "Re:", indicating a follow-up, there had to be a valid "References" field that contained the Message-ID of a previous message.  Crossposts to groups outside the net.* hierarchy were cancelled automatically.

No message were allowed to spawn a discussion in more than three newsgroups. This applied both to the "newsgroups" field and the "Followup-To" field.  It was permissible to post the same message three times.  Posting the same message every day or every week was not permitted.

The effort to extend Usenet II was abandoned as technical means to fight spam and other abuse on traditional Usenet became more effective and spammers migrated from Usenet to email.

See also
 Network News Transfer Protocol
 Usenet

References

 Usenet II on Google Groups
 "Usenet II: Freedom or Tyranny?"--HotWired story, February 26, 1998
 "Usenet II Urges Netizens to Come On In"--HotWired story, April 2, 1998

Usenet
Computer-related introductions in 1998